Omoconazole is an azole antifungal drug.

Omonocazole is not available in the United States and Canada. In other countries, it is used to treat cutaneous candidiasis, dermatophytosis, pityriasis versicolor.

References 

Chlorobenzenes
Phenol ethers
Imidazole antifungals
Lanosterol 14α-demethylase inhibitors